Bhawna Dehariya (born 12 November 1991) is an Indian mountaineer born in Village Tamia, District Chhindawara, Madhya Pradesh. She has climbed the summits of several peaks around the world including the summit of Mount Everest on 22 May 2019. She holds a Guinness World Records title for promoting and popularising Indian Himalaya with the Himalayan Mountaineering Institute on 15 August 2020 (Independence Day). She is the Vice President and Brand Ambassador of Jan Parishad, a national level social enterprise.

Early life 

Dehariya was born on 12 November 1991. She hails from Village Tamia, Chhindawara, Madhya Pradesh.

Dehariya has done Masters of Physical Education (M.P.Ed) and Bachelor of Physical Education (B.P.E & B.P.Ed) from VNS College of Physical Education and Management Studies affiliated to Barkatullah University, Bhopal. She holds Post Graduate Diploma in Naturopathy and Yogic Science from Mahatma Gandhi Chitrakoot Gramodaya Vishwavidyalaya.

She has represented Madhya Pradesh by participating in numerous sports at the national level like cycle polo, artificial sports climbing (a form of rock climbing), basketball, and softball.

Career 
Dehariya holds her mountaineering certifications in Methods of Instructions (MOI), Advance Mountaineering (AMC), and Basic Mountaineering course (BMC) from Nehru Institute of Mountaineering, Uttarkashi, Uttarakhand with Grade 'A'. 

In August 2018, she was selected by the Ministry of Sports and Youth Welfare, Government of India, Delhi for mountaineering where she climbed 6593 meters high at the Mount Manirang peak. In May 2019, Dehariya became the first woman from Madhya Pradesh to climb the world's highest peak, 8,848-metre-high Mount Everest in Nepal.

Summits

Honors and awards 
2020:

Guinness World Records holder for promoting and popularising Indian Himalaya with the Himalayan Mountaineering Institute on 15 August 2020 (Independence Day)
Honoured as and holds the position of Vice President and Brand Ambassador of Jan Parishad since 26 August 2020
Received ‘Devi Award’ by the Chief Minister Kamal Nath of Madhya Pradesh in Indore in February 2020

Sports achievements 

 Represented The All India Softball Championship, 2017, (Kochi)
 Represented National Basketball Championship at school level, 2008, (Jabalpur) 
 Represented 12th Junior (Girls) Cycle Polo National Championship, 2008-09 (Kochi)

See also 
 Indian summiteers of Mount Everest
 Premlata Agarwal
 Malavath Purna

References 

Living people
1991 births
Indian female mountain climbers
Indian mountain climbers
Indian summiters of Mount Everest
Sportswomen from Madhya Pradesh
21st-century Indian women
21st-century Indian people
People from Madhya Pradesh